Ochyrotica fasciata is a moth of the family Pterophoridae. It is widely distributed in the tropical zone of the Neotropical Region, including Brazil, Costa Rica, Cuba, Dominica, Ecuador, Grenada, Guatemala, Jamaica, Peru and Puerto Rico.

The wingspan is 12–16 mm. Adults are on wing year round.

The larvae feed on Ipomaea batatas.

External links

Ochyroticinae
Taxa named by Thomas de Grey, 6th Baron Walsingham
Moths described in 1891